Wolgye-dong is a dong, neighbourhood of Nowon-gu in Seoul, South Korea.

See also 
Administrative divisions of South Korea

References

External links
 Nowon-gu Official site in English
 Map of Nowon-gu
 Nowon-gu Official site
 Wolgye 1-dong Resident office 

Neighbourhoods of Nowon District